Woman-Wise is a 1937 American crime film directed by Allan Dwan and written by Ben Markson. The film stars Rochelle Hudson, Michael Whalen, Thomas Beck, Alan Dinehart, Douglas Fowley and George Hassell. The film was released on January 22, 1937, by 20th Century Fox.

Plot

Cast   
Rochelle Hudson as Alice Fuller
Michael Whalen as Tracey Browne
Thomas Beck as Clint De Witt
Alan Dinehart as Richards
Douglas Fowley as Stevens
George Hassell as John De Witt
Astrid Allwyn as 'Bubbles' Carson
Chick Chandler as Bob Benton
Pat Flaherty as Duke Fuller

References

External links 
 

1937 films
20th Century Fox films
American crime films
1937 crime films
Films directed by Allan Dwan
American black-and-white films
1930s English-language films
1930s American films